Ross "Shine" Taylor was an American baseball left fielder in the Negro leagues. He played with the Toledo Crawfords in 1939.

References

External links
 and Seamheads

Toledo Crawfords players
Year of birth unknown
Year of death unknown
Baseball outfielders